Boston is an unincorporated community in Highland County, in the U.S. state of Ohio.

History
Boston was laid out in 1840, and named after Boston, Massachusetts. A variant name was Dallas. A post office called Dallas was established in 1845, and remained in operation until 1905.

References

Unincorporated communities in Highland County, Ohio
Unincorporated communities in Ohio